Mount St. Mary's and other forms of the name may refer to:

Higher education
Mount Saint Mary College
 Mount Saint Mary College, a private college in Newburgh, New York
 Mount Saint Mary College (New Hampshire), a defunct private college for women, in Hooksett, New Hampshire (closed 1978)

Mount St. Mary's University
 Mount St. Mary's University, a private liberal arts university in Emmitsburg, Maryland
 Mount Saint Mary's University, Los Angeles, a private liberal arts college, primarily for women, in Los Angeles

Secondary education

Mount Saint Mary Academy
 Mount Saint Mary Academy (Kenmore, New York)
 Mount St. Mary Academy (Little Rock, Arkansas)
 Mount St. Mary Academy, Watchung, New Jersey
 Mount Saint Mary's Convent and Academy, Grass Valley, California

Mount St. Mary's School
 Mount St Mary's School, India, in New Delhi, co-educational school run by the Brothers of St Patrick
 Mount St Mary's School (New Delhi), the same school as above
 Mount St. Mary High School (Oklahoma), a private high school in Oklahoma City, United States
 Mount St Mary's Catholic High School, Leeds, United Kingdom

Mount St Mary's College
 Mount St Mary's College, a private coeducational boarding school, at Spinkhill, Derbyshire, near Sheffield, England
 Mount Saint Mary's College Namagunga, an all-girl boarding school near Lugazi, Uganda

Seminaries
 Mount St. Mary's Seminary of the West, a seminary and a division of the Athenaeum of Ohio, in Cincinnati
 Mount St. Mary's Seminary and College, now part of Mount St. Mary's University, in Emmitsburg, Maryland

Other uses
Mount Saint Mary's Hospital in Lewiston, New York, United States
St Mary's Church, Walsall, also known as St Mary's the Mount Church, West Midlands, United Kingdom
Mount St Mary's Church, Leeds, West Yorkshire, United Kingdom
St. Mary's Mount, an alternate name for the eastern spires of Mission Ridge (British Columbia), Canada